Raphael Kpodo Kugblenu was a Ghanaian police officer and was the Inspector General of Police of the Ghana Police Service from 1981-1984. He died on Friday 24 April 2015.

References

Ghanaian police officers
Ghanaian Inspector Generals of Police
Year of birth missing
2015 deaths